= Karambavane =

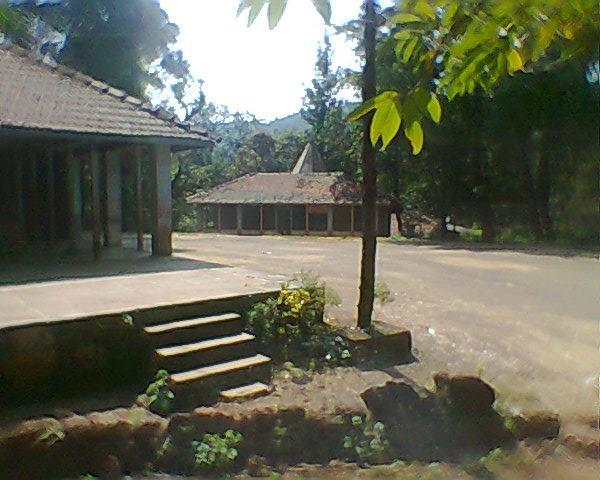
Karambavane, December 2017

Karambavane is a village in Maharashtra, India. In Ratnagiri district which is near by Vashishti River.

The population was recorded as 1,563 in the 2011 Census of India.
